This is a list of flag bearers who have represented Nepal at the Olympics.

Flag bearers carry the national flag of their country at the opening ceremony of the Olympic Games.

See also
Nepal at the Olympics
List of Olympic athletes of Nepal

References

Nepal at the Olympics
Nepal
Olympic flagbearers
Olympic flagbearers